The Travancore Cochin Republican Praja Party was a political party in Travancore-Cochin, India. The party was floated in 1951 by a group of wealthy plantation owners, led by A.V. George. A.V. George was the general secretary of the party and A.C.M. Anthraper was its president. The party had a right-wing profile.

The party fielded seven candidates in the 1951 Travancore-Cochin Legislative Assembly election. In spite of having plenty of money for their campaign, none of its candidates were elected. Together they obtained 53,034 votes (1.56% of the votes in the state). A.V. George himself finished in second place in the Kottayam constituency, with 8,649 votes
(29.07%).

The party was dissolved in 1952.

References

Political parties in Travancore–Cochin
Political parties established in 1951
Political parties disestablished in 1952
1951 establishments in Travancore–Cochin
1952 disestablishments in India